The 2009 FIA WTCC Race of Portugal was the seventh round of the 2009 World Touring Car Championship season and the third FIA WTCC Race of Portugal. It was held on 5 July 2009 at the temporary Circuito da Boavista street course in Porto, Portugal. The first race was won by Gabriele Tarquini for SEAT Sport and the second race was won by Augusto Farfus for BMW Team Germany.

Background
The second race of the day was the 100th World Touring Car Championship race since its reintroduction at Monza in 2005. It also saw the debut of the new Lada Priora, with former race-winner James Thompson behind the wheel for LADA Sport. Diego Puyo made his series debut for SUNRED Engineering, after scoring more points than any other driver in the SEAT Leon Eurocup round at Brno.

Report

Testing and Free Practice
Testing took place on Friday afternoon, with Augusto Farfus quickest in the half-hour session for BMW Team Germany. The first free practice session took place on the Saturday morning, with Farfus quickest again. Chevrolet's Rob Huff was quickest in the second practice session shortly after midday.

Qualifying
Qualifying took place on the Saturday afternoon. SEAT Sport's Yvan Muller was quickest in Qualifying 1, after which the fastest ten drivers go through to Qualifying 2. Gabriele Tarquini took pole position for SEAT Sport, with Huff second and Yvan Muller third. Tom Coronel was the fastest independent in Qualifying, starting from 12th.

Warm Up
The fifteen-minute Sunday morning warm-up session took part on a wet track, with Rob Huff fastest.

Race One
Race 1 started on a drying track at 11:34 local time. The red flag was brought out and the race was suspended at the end of the first lap for two separate incidents on the opening lap. As the leaders made their way away from the grid, the BMW of Sergio Hernández and the Lada of Jaap van Lagen, who started 17th and 18th respectively tangled after the rolling start, pitching Hernandez in the concrete barrier. Hernandez was subsequently taken to hospital for checks on his ankle. Later on in the lap, Farfus collided with Alain Menu, spinning Menu into the wall. Nicola Larini tagged Tiago Monteiro as they tried to avoid the incident. The track became blocked as Mehdi Bennani ran into Menu's stationary Chevrolet Cruze.

After the restart Tarquini led Huff and Yvan Muller to victory. On the last lap, Andy Priaulx, running in fourth, and Jorg Muller, running seventh, slowed to allow BWW teammate Farfus (who had served a drive-through-penalty for the first lap incident with Menu) past them to allow him to finish eighth, securing one championship point and pole position for the second race.

Stefano D'Aste was the leading independent, finishing in tenth place. Tarquini recorded the fastest lap of the race.

Race Two
Race 2 started at 16:50 local time. The unusually large gap in time between the two races was to allow for TV broadcaster Eurosport to cover the Tour de France. On the third lap Rob Huff passed teammate Nicola Larini for sixth. Gabriele Tarquini tried to make a late move down the inside of Larini to follow Huff past but the two Italian veterans collided and both ended up in the tyre wall on the exit of the turn. As the field went on by, Mehdi Bennani ran wide and as he picked his way through the middle of the two stranded cars he rejoined the racing line in the path of fellow SEAT driver Tom Boardman. The safety car was deployed.

Farfus was still leading when the race was red-flagged following a crash involving Alain Menu and Franz Engstler on lap 10, which left Menu's car stranded in the middle of the narrow track. Farfus completed the two laps after the stoppage to win the 100th WTCC race ahead of four SEATs.

Stefano D'Aste was once again the independents’ winner and Farfus took the fastest lap.

Results

Qualifying

Race 1

Bold denotes Fastest lap.

Race 2

Bold denotes Fastest lap.

Standings after the race 

Drivers' Championship standings

Independents' Trophy standings

Manufacturers' Championship standings

 Note: Only the top five positions are included for both sets of drivers' standings.

References

External links 
Results Booklet PDF at MST Systems

FIA WTCC Race of Portugal
Portugal
World Touring Car Championship